Pteleopsis tetraptera is a species of plant in the Combretaceae family. It is found in Kenya and Tanzania. It is threatened by habitat loss.

References

tetraptera
Near threatened plants
Taxonomy articles created by Polbot
Taxobox binomials not recognized by IUCN